Syed Manzoorul Islam (born 18 January 1951) is a Bangladeshi critic, writer and a former professor of Dhaka University. As a literary critic, he has written criticism on writers including Michael Madhusudan Dutt, Kazi Nazrul Islam, Sudhindranath Dutta, Samar Sen, and Shamsur Rahman. He received a Bangla Academy Literary Award in 1996, and his 2005 short stories collection Prem o Prarthanar Galpo was Prothom Alo's book of the year. He became the president of PEN Bangladesh in January 2018.

Life and career
Islam was born in the city of Sylhet to Syed Amirul Islam and Rabeya Khatun. He passed the entrance examination from Sylhet Government Pilot High School in 1966 and Intermediate examination from Sylhet MC College in 1968. He received his graduate and post-graduate degree from the University of Dhaka respectively in 1971 and 1972. Later he went to Canada and earned a PhD from Queen's University, Kingston in 1981. In 1989, he went to the University of Southern Mississippi at Hattiesburg as a Fulbright Scholar and taught there one semester. He retired from the faculty position at the University of Dhaka and joined University of Liberal Arts Bangladesh.

Literary writings
Islam used to write from his childhood. While reading in class six, he published his writing in a magazine, Shikkhok Samachar. During his university days as a student, his friend's father fell sick and died in pain. This emotionally affected Islam and led him to write his first story, "Bishal Mrittu" in 1973. It received a positive response; but he abstained from publishing anything during his days in Canada. On his return to Bangladesh, he returned to writing and began contributing a regular column "Olosh Diner Hawa" in the literary section of the Dainik Sangbad. He wrote on issues including art and literature. In 1989, Islam started writing for the magazine Bichinta, which published many of his post-modern stories.

Islam describes himself as "a critic by training and a writer by compulsion". Though he writes in many genres, he himself values his fictional work more than his other writings. In his stories, he usually incorporates his own experiences. He tries to live the life of his characters, seeing the world through their eyes and describing their pain and happiness. Of the surrealistic nature in his writing, he said that in his childhood he used to listen to fairy-tales in which surrealistic elements were an integral part and that gave his writing a similar texture. He believes that "the surreal is the flip side of reality - it is what gives meaning to our everydayness".

Bibliography

Collections of Short stories
Shrestho Golpo (1994)
Thaka na-thakar Golpo (1996)
Kach Bhanga Rater Golpo (1998)
Alo O Ondhokar Dekhar Golpo (2001)
Prem O Prarthonar Golpo (2005)
Shukhdukkher Galpo (2011)
Bela Obelar Galpo (2012)
The Merman's Prayer and Other Stories (in English) (2013)

Novels
Adhakhana  Manush 2006)
Tin Parber Jiban 2008)
Kanagalir Manushera (2009)
Ajgubi Rat (2010)
Dinratriguli (2013)

Essays
Nandantattwa (1985)
Katipaya Prabandha (1992)

Rabindranther Jyamiti o Anyanya Shilpaprashanga (2011) 
Olosh Diner Haowa (2012)

References

1951 births
Living people
People from Sylhet
Bangladeshi male novelists
Bangladeshi short story writers
Bengali–English translators
University of Dhaka alumni
Academic staff of the University of Dhaka
Bangladeshi columnists
Recipients of Bangla Academy Award
Recipients of the Ekushey Padak
Murari Chand College alumni
Academic staff of the University of Liberal Arts Bangladesh